Herophydrus musicus, is a species of predaceous diving beetle found in Asia and Europe.

Distribution
The species is widely distributed throughout Middle East, European and Asian regions. It is found in Afghanistan, China, Europe, Iran, Iraq, Israel, Kazakhstan, Myanmar, Nepal, North Africa, India, Pakistan, Sri Lanka, Syria, Tajikistan, Turkey, Uzbekistan and Yemen. It is the only species of the genus Herophydrus occurring on the European mainland. In Europe, the beetle is found in Spain, Italy, Greece, Malta, Maltese Islands, Ukraine, Armenia, Azerbaijan, the South European Territory of Russia, Canary Islands, Croatia, Bulgaria and the Greek island of Peloponnese.

Description
This small species has a body length of 2.88 to 3.60 mm. Head shiny and pale ferrugineous in color sometimes there is a posteriorly narrow darkened area. Punctation in head is fine to rather fine, scattered and irregularly distributed. There is a densely punctate, narrow furrow at inner eye margin. Head almost totally pale and without dark interocular marking. Head frontal margin incomplete and laterally well-developed. Antenna pale ferrugineous. Pronotum shiny and with curved to almost straight lateral outline. It is pale ferrugineous in color. Anteriorly and posteriorly a fairly narrow darkened area is visible. Punctation dense to fairly dense and slightly irregularly distributed. Elytra pale ferrugineous and shiny, with dark ferrugineous to blackish variable markings. Some specimen has strongly reduced dark stripes. Elytral punctation is fine and densely distributed. Ventrum blackish to dark ferrugineous. Prothorax pale ferrugineous and shiny. Punctation coarse to rather fine and irregularly distributed. Legs are pale ferrugineous where lower parts of hindlegs are musch darker. Protarsi and mesotarsi are slightly enlarged. In male aedeagus obtuse and lacks sharp lateral flaps dorsally.

Larva fusiformate. Sclerites are brownish. Stemmata present. Second antennomere lack second setae, whereas antennomere 3 lacks ventro-apical spinula. Prementum consists with lateral spinulae.

Biology
It is a desert species inhabited in small, exposed, sparsely or only partly vegetated bodies of water on heavy loam and clay soils. Beetle larvae is found from a shallow irrigation ponds, with substrate of sand and clay and with vegetation of Juncus and Typha angustifolia growth.

References 

Dytiscidae
Insects of Sri Lanka
Insects described in 1834